is a Japanese former professional footballer who played as a defensive midfielder. He made over 600 career appearances for Kashiwa Reysol and stayed with them for his entire career.

Playing career
Otani was born in Nagareyama on 6 November 1984. He joined J1 League club Kashiwa Reysol from youth team in 2003. He debuted in 2003 and played many matches as defensive midfielder from 2004. Although he became a regular player summer 2005, Reysol was relegated to J2 League end of 2005 season. In 2006, he played many matches as left side back and left side midfielder and was promoted to J1 in a year. From 2007, he played as regular left side back. 

From Summer 2009, he was returned to his original position, defensive midfielder under new manager Nelsinho Baptista and played as regular defensive midfielder for a long time. Reysol also won the 2nd place in 2008 Emperor's Cup. However the club results were sluggish and was relegated to J2 end of 2009 season again. Reysol won the champions in 2010 season and was returned to J1 in a year. In 2011, Reysol won the champions in J1 League first time in the club history. 

From 2012, Reysol won the champions in 2012 Emperor's Cup and 2013 J.League Cup.

Club statistics

Honours
Kashiwa Reysol
 J.League Division 1: 2011
 J.League Division 2: 2010, 2019
 J.League Cup: 2013
 Emperor's Cup: 2012
 Japanese Super Cup: 2012
 Suruga Bank Championship: 2014

References

External links

Profile at Kashiwa Reysol

1984 births
Living people
People from Nagareyama
Association football people from Chiba Prefecture
Japanese footballers
J1 League players
J2 League players
Kashiwa Reysol players
Association football midfielders